The next election to the Hamburg Parliament is scheduled for 2025.

Background 
In 2020, the SPD was the strongest party by a long way ahead of the Greens, but lost four seats. The Greens almost doubled their share of the vote. The CDU achieved its historically worst result in a general election with 11.2 percent, the left with 9.1 percent its best. The AfD just managed to get back in with 5.3 percent of the votes.

The FDP, on the other hand, fell just short of the five percent hurdle with 4.96 percent and missed out on entering parliament for the first time since 2008. However, because of a direct mandate from its top candidate, Anna-Elisabeth von Treuenfels-Frowein, in the Blankenese constituency, the FDP is represented by a non-attached member of parliament.

The Second Tschentscher senate was formed as a Red-Green coalition.

Opinion polls

References

See also 

2020s in Hamburg
2025 elections in Germany
Elections in Hamburg